Pseudophaloe patula is a moth of the family Erebidae first described by Francis Walker in 1854. It is found in Bolivia.

References

Moths described in 1854
Pseudophaloe